Steven "Steve" J. Wallach (born September 1945 in Brooklyn, New York) is an engineer, consultant and technology manager.  He is a Seymour Cray Computer Engineering Award recipient.

Education 
Wallach received his BS in electrical engineering from Polytechnic University in Brooklyn, his MS in electrical engineering, from University of Pennsylvania and an MBA from Boston University.

Career
Wallach retired from Micron, and is currently a guest scientist at LANL (Los Alamos). Previously Wallach was the co-founder and CTO of Convey Computers.  After Micron Technology bought Convey,  Wallach became a design director. Wallach was previously Vice President of technology for Chiaro Networks and was co-founder of Convex Computer, their Chief Technology Officer and Senior V.P. of Development.
After Hewlett-Packard bought Convex, Wallach became the chief technology officer of Hewlett-Packard's large systems group. He was also a visiting professor at Rice University from 1998–1999. Prior to Convex, he was manager of Advanced Development for Data General. His efforts on the MV/8000 are chronicled in Tracy Kidder's Pulitzer Prize winner The Soul of a New Machine. Prior to that, he was an engineer at Raytheon, where he worked on the All Applications Digital Computer (AADC). Wallach has 76 american patents and is a member of the National Academy of Engineering, an IEEE Fellow and was a founding member of PITAC (The Presidential Information Technology Advisory Committee).

He is currently an adviser to Centerpoint Venture partners, Sevin Rosen Funds, and Interwest, and a consultant to the United States Department of Energy Advanced Scientific Computing (ASC) program at Los Alamos National Laboratory.

Awards 
Wallach was awarded the 2008 Seymour Cray Computer Science and Engineering Award for his "contribution to high-performance computing through design of innovative vector and parallel computing systems, notably the Convex mini-supercomputer series, a distinguished industrial career and acts of public service." In 2002 he received the IEEE Computer Society Charles Babbage Award.

References

External links 
 The New York Times, November 16, 2008: A Computing Pioneer Has a New Idea by John Markoff.
 The New York Times, November 24, 2008: Sound Bytes; The Soul of an Inventor by John Markoff.
 Wired article revisiting "The Soul of a New Machine" and the team after twenty years

1945 births
Living people
American consultants
Seymour Cray Computer Engineering Award recipients
University of Pennsylvania School of Engineering and Applied Science alumni
Boston University School of Management alumni
Rice University staff
American chief technology officers
Polytechnic Institute of New York University alumni